Steve Andrew (born 27 January 1966) is an English first-class and List A cricketer who played First-class cricket for  Hampshire County Cricket Club and Essex County Cricket Club. He also played for these teams in List A games and he also played List A games for Hertfordshire. His highest score in First-class cricket of 35 came when playing for Essex in the match against Northamptonshire County Cricket Club. His best bowling in First-class cricket of 7/47 came when playing for Essex in the match against Lancashire County Cricket Club.
His highest List A score of 32 came when playing for Essex against Yorkshire County Cricket Club. His best bowling of 5/24 in List A cricket came when playing for Essex in a match against Hampshire County Cricket Club.

He also represented England at the Youth level in Tests. and at Youth One Day level.

He also played 113 Second XI Championship games for Hampshire's and Essex's second XI teams. and also 52 Second XI for Essex's and Hampshire's Second XI teams.

He played 18 Minor Counties Championship games for Hertfordshire. and also 11 Minor Counties trophy games for Hertfordshire.

References

External links

1966 births
Living people
People from Marylebone
Cricketers from Greater London
English cricketers
Hampshire cricketers
Essex cricketers
Hertfordshire cricketers